Tanvi Azmi is an Indian film and television actress.

Early life and career
She was born to Marathi-Hindi actress Usha Kiran and Manohar Kher.

Azmi portrayed a troubled doctor in the tele-series, Jeevanrekha and as a young widow in telefilm Rao Saheb (1986) directed by Vijaya Mehta. She also acted   in the Malayalam language film Vidheyan (1993), directed by Adoor Gopalakrishnan.

She received a nomination for Filmfare Award for Best Supporting Actress for her role in film Akele Hum Akele Tum (1995).

In 2014, she appeared in Sanjay Leela Bhansali's film Bajirao Mastani playing the role of Radhabai, mother of Bajirao I. She had to go bald for her role in the movie. She got the National Film Award for Best Supporting Actress for her outstanding performance in the film Bajirao Mastani. In 2017, she acted in And TV’s Vani Rani

Tanvi Azmi in her upcoming project 'Tribhanga: Tedhi Medhi Crazy' a Netflix original film directed by Renuka Shahane. The movie also stars Kajol and Mithila Palkar.

Personal life
Azmi is married to Baba Azmi, cinematographer and brother of Shabana Azmi, thus connected with the Akhtar-Azmi film family.

Filmography

Awards and nominations

References

External links

 

Indian film actresses
Living people
Actresses in Hindi cinema
Place of birth missing (living people)
Year of birth missing (living people)
Indian television actresses
Actresses in Marathi cinema
Actresses in Malayalam cinema
Actresses in Hindi television
20th-century Indian actresses
21st-century Indian actresses
Best Supporting Actress National Film Award winners